The 1959 Australian Tourist Trophy was a motor race for sports cars staged at the Lowood circuit in Queensland, Australia on 14 June 1959. It was the third in a sequence of annual Australian Tourist Trophy races, each of these being recognised by the Confederation of Australian Motor Sport as the Australian Championship for sports cars. 

The race was won by Ron Phillips driving a Cooper T38 Jaguar.

Results

Notes
 Meeting organiser: QRDC (Queensland Racing Drivers Club)
 Attendance: 20,000 (record crowd)
 Race distance: 36 laps, 102 miles
 Number of starters: Unknown
 First Queensland competitor: Bill Pitt (Jaguar D-Type)
 New GT lap record: T Basile (Porsche Carrera), 2:13
 Handicap results (over first 20 laps): 1st - B Coventry (MGA), 2nd - Tom Ross (Triumph TR2), 3rd - T Basile (Porsche Carrera)

References

External links
  Image of front cover of Australian Motor Sports, July 1959, featuring the Ron Phillips Cooper Jaguar at Lowood, www.flickr.com

Australian Tourist Trophy
Tourist Trophy
Motorsport in Queensland